The women's 3000 metres sprint competition of the athletics events at the 1979 Pan American Games took place on 7 July at the Estadio Sixto Escobar.

Records
Prior to this competition, the existing world record was as follows:

Results
All times are in minutes and seconds. Since it was the first time this event was held in the Pan American Games, Jan Merrill's winning time was registered as a Pan American record.

Final

References

Athletics at the 1979 Pan American Games
1979